The 2016–17 V-League season was the 13th season of the V-League, the highest professional volleyball league in South Korea. The season started on 15 October 2016 and finished on 3 April 2017. Ansan OK Savings Bank Rush & Cash were the defending champions in the men's league and Suwon Hyundai Engineering & Construction Hillstate the defending female champions.

Teams

Men's clubs

Women's clubs

Season standing procedure 
 Match points
 Number of matches won
 Sets ratio
 Points ratio
 Result of the last match between the tied teams

Match won 3–0 or 3–1: 3 match points for the winner, 0 match points for the loser
Match won 3–2: 2 match points for the winner, 1 match point for the loser

Regular season

League table (Male)

League table (Female)

Play-offs

Bracket (Male)

Bracket (Female)

Top Scorers

Men's

Women's

Player of the Round

Men's

Women's

Final standing

Men's League

Women's League

References

External links
 Official website 

2016 in volleyball
2017 in volleyball
V-League (South Korea)
2016 in South Korean sport
2017 in South Korean sport